Calocedrus, the incense cedar (alternatively spelled incense-cedar), is a genus of coniferous trees in the cypress family Cupressaceae first described as a genus in 1873. It is native to eastern Asia and western North America.
The generic name Calocedrus means "beautiful cedar".

Description
The genus is related to the Thuja, and has similar overlapping scale-leaves. Calocedrus differs from Thuja in the scale leaves being in apparent whorls of four (actually opposite decussate pairs like Thuja, but not evenly spaced apart as in Thuja, instead with the successive pairs closely then distantly spaced), and in the cones having just 2–3 pairs of moderately thin, erect scales, rather than 4–6 pairs of very thin scales in Thuja.

Species

Extant Species

Extinct Species

Uses

Bows and Arrows
Incense cedar was one of the favored varieties of wood used to make bows by Native Americans in California. Like Juniper, and Pacific Yew, the other two coveted bow woods among Pacific Natives, this wood has excellent flexibility and compression strength-weight ratio. When backed with sinew, it produces extremely flexible, fast, hard-hitting bows, which are rivaled only by horn-sinew composite bows for their ability to store and release elastic energy. The archer Saxton Pope observed that Ishi used this wood to produce short bows.

Lumber
The wood of Calocedrus is soft, moderately decay-resistant, and with a strong spicy-resinous fragrance. That of C. decurrens is the primary material for wooden pencils, because it is soft and tends to sharpen easily without forming splinters. The two Asian species were (at least in the past) in very high demand for coffin manufacture in China, due to the scent of the wood and its decay resistance. It is likely that past over-exploitation is responsible for their current rarity.

Incense cedar was the preferred hearth board of the Native Peoples of Northern California for lighting fires by friction.

Cultivation
Calocedrus decurrens, the California incense cedar, is a popular ornamental tree, grown particularly in locations with cool summer climates like Britain, Washington and British Columbia. Its very narrow columnar crown in landscape settings, an unexplained consequence of the climatic conditions in these areas, is not shown by trees in their native 'wild' habitat. The California incense cedar is also valued for its drought tolerance. The Asian species are rarely cultivated.

References

External links
 Arboretum de Villardebelle - cone photos
 

 
Trees of the Western United States
Trees of China
Trees of the Northwestern United States
Trees of the Southwestern United States
Flora of the Sierra Nevada (United States)
Garden plants of North America
Drought-tolerant plants
Conifer genera